Ray Minshull (15 July 19202005) was an English footballer who played as a goalkeeper for Liverpool in The Football League. Minshull signed for Liverpool in 1946 and made 6 appearances during the 1946–47 season. He was never able to cement his place in the first-team ahead of regular goalkeeper Cyril Sidlow and left the club in 1951 to join Southport

Ray Minshull died in 2005.

References

1920 births
2005 deaths
Liverpool F.C. players
Southport F.C. players
English Football League players
English footballers
Footballers from Bolton
Place of birth missing
Association football goalkeepers